This is a list of Nigerian films released in 2006.

Films

See also
List of Nigerian films

References

External links
2006 films at the Internet Movie Database

2006
Lists of 2006 films by country or language
Films